WRFM (103.9 FM) is a radio station broadcasting a sports format, licensed to Drakesboro, Kentucky, United States. The station is currently owned by Nashville's Sportsradio, Incorporated and features programming from ABC Radio and CBS Sports Radio. This programming is a simulcast of Nashville-market AM radio station WNSR.

History 
The station signed on the air as WNTC in 1999.

In October 2001, sometime after the license was moved to its current location in Drakesboro, Kentucky, the station was acquired by Nashville Sportsradio, Inc., a unit of Southern Wabash Communications. That company, which owns WNSR of Brentwood, Tennessee, converted the station into a full-time repeater of that station, hence making a sports radio station. This makes the WNSR coverage area expanded into the Kentucky portion of the Clarksville, TN-Hopkinsville, KY radio market, and making coverage available well into portions of many Kentucky counties, including Butler, Logan, Ohio, McLean, and Hopkins County, Kentucky.

On June 25, 2020, WNTC switched call letters with 91.3 FM in Scottsville, Kentucky, and became WPDQ. Those call letters returned to Scottsville in October 2021, and this facility became WRFM.

References

External links

 

RFM (FM)
Radio stations established in 2001
2001 establishments in Kentucky
CBS Sports Radio stations
Sports radio stations in the United States
Muhlenberg County, Kentucky